James Guillaume (February 16, 1844, London – November 20, 1916, Paris) was a leading member of the Jura federation, the anarchist wing of the First International. Later, Guillaume would take an active role in the founding of the Anarchist St. Imier International.

Work
In his 1876 essay, "Ideas on Social Organization," Guillaume set forth his opinions regarding the form that society would take in a post-revolutionary world, expressing the collectivist anarchist position he shared with Bakunin and other anti-authoritarians involved in the First International:
Whatever items are produced by collective labor will belong to the community, and each member will receive remuneration for his labor either in the form of commodities (subsistence, supplies, clothing, etc.) or in currency.
Only later, he believed, would it be possible to progress to a communist system where distribution will be according to need: 
When, thanks to the progress of scientific industry and agriculture, production comes to outstrip consumption, and this will be attained some years after the Revolution, it will no longer be necessary to stingily dole out each worker’s share of goods. Everyone will draw what he needs from the abundant social reserve of commodities, without fear of depletion; and the moral sentiment which will be more highly developed among free and equal workers will prevent, or greatly reduce, abuse and waste.

In 1909, James Guillaume assisted Peter Kropotkin with the research in preparing his book, "The Great French Revolution, 1789-1793," particularly helping with regards to the resolutions (arrêtés) of August 4, 1789, where the Assembly declared that it is acting with both constituent and legislative power.  Guillaume is said to have played a key role in Peter Kropotkin's conversion to anarchism.

Writings
 L'Internationale: Documents et Souvenirs (1864–1878), 4 vols., reprinted in 1969 by Burt Franklin Publishing, New York.
 Ideas on Social Organization
 Pestalozzi : étude biographique (1890), Hachette, Paris. 
 Michael Bakunin, a Biography (1907)
 Karl Marx, pangermaniste, et l’Association internationale des travailleurs de 1864 à 1870 (1915), A. Colin, Paris.

He also edited five of the six volumes of Bakunin's collected works (in French), which included the first biography of Bakunin.

See also 
 Manifesto of the Sixteen
 Paul Brousse
 Lyon and Besançon Commune

References

Archive sources 
Part of James Guillaume's archives are conserved in the "Archives de l'État de Neuchâtel". The collection contains correspondence, notes, articles and memorabilia.

External links
 About James Guillaume
 Guillaume, James, entry in the Historical Dictionary of Switzerland
 Anarchy Archives, Guillaume page
 A research blog dedicated to James Guillaume : http://jguillaume.hypotheses.org/
 James Guillaume Works
 James Guillaume Archive at Marxists.org
 James Guillaume Archive at TheAnarchistLibrary.org
 James Guillaume Archive at RevoltLib.com
 Archive of James Guillaume Papers at the International Institute of Social History

1844 births
1916 deaths
Writers from London
Swiss anarchists
Members of the International Workingmen's Association
Collectivist anarchists
Jura Federation